Micropolis, la cité des insectes (city of insects) is situated in the Lévézou region of France, at Saint-Léons, near Millau.  Micropolis is a museum dedicated to the entomologist Jean-Henri Fabre and inspired by the film, Microcosmos, of 1996.

Micropolis is also a scientific centre with an experimental station on biodiversity.

External links 
 Micropolis website 
 Micropolis website (in English)
 The museum and birth house of Jean-Henri Fabre 

Biographical museums in France
Natural history museums in France
Museums in Aveyron
Insectariums